Bar River Airport  is a private airport located  southwest of Bar River, Ontario, Canada, and operated by Springer Aerospace Ltd. The airport has a published instrument approach.

See also
Bar River Water Aerodrome

References

Registered aerodromes in Algoma District